A number of New York City historical anniversaries have been commemorated as civic events by centennials and at similar landmark dates. Several of these could be considered founding myths of the city, though there have been disagreements on when it was actually "founded". For example, the Seal of New York City has been variously marked by the years 1686, 1664 and 1625 over its history, by steps attributing an earlier founding date. Sometimes these anniversaries have occasioned major celebrations, and sometimes not.

Years commemorated

Before English conquest
1609, September 12: Henry Hudson and his Halve Maen arrive at Hudson River
300th anniversary: Hudson–Fulton Celebration
400th anniversary: NY400 and New Amsterdam Plein and Pavilion
1614, October 11: New Netherland Company founded
300th anniversary: Commercial Tercentenary
1623, June 20: Dutch West India Company secures province status for New Netherland

1624, May: Cornelius Jacobsen May and WIC ship New Netherland arrive at Hudson River with first settlers to Governors Island (and also Fort Orange), as planned by Jessé de Forest
300th anniversary: Huguenot-Walloon New Netherland Commission, including Walloon Settlers Memorial at the Battery and Huguenot-Walloon half dollar
1625: Fort Amsterdam built as new seat of government of New Netherland at site chosen and designed by Cryn Fredericks under Willem Verhulst, and cattle transferred from Governors Island 
Date marked on 1975 flag and 1977 seal
350th anniversary: update of city flag and city seal after Paul O'Dwyer campaign
1626, May 24: Peter Minuit and his "purchase" of Manhattan
300th anniversary: Netherland Monument at the Battery
1653, February 2: New Amsterdam municipal rights after lobbying by Adriaen van der Donck
300th anniversary: Peter Minuit Plaza and Shorakapok Rock

After English conquest
1664, September 6: Conquest of New Netherland and Articles of Surrender of New Netherland
Date marked on 1915 flag and seal
300th anniversary: 1964 New York World's Fair
1665, June 24: Thomas Willett first mayor of City of New York
250th anniversary: establishment of city flag and update of city seal
1686, April 27: Dongan Charter
Date marked on 1686 seal
establishment of first locally-approved city seal
1783, November 25: Evacuation Day
100th anniversary: Evacuation Day Centennial and George Washington at Federal Hall
1789, April 30: First inauguration of George Washington
100th anniversary: Washington Square Arch
150th anniversary: 1939 New York World's Fair
1898, January 1: City of Greater New York
25th anniversary: Silver Jubilee, civic, industrial and fraternal parades, and Municipal Educational Exposition at Grand Central Palace
50th anniversary: Golden Jubilee, "New York at Work" parade, Grand Central Palace exhibition, Idlewild Airport opening
75th anniversary: Diamond Jubilee
100th anniversary: Greater New York Centennial

References

New York (state) historical anniversaries
Anniversaries of cities
Symbols of New York City
History of New York City
New York City-related lists
New York